Blue vervain is a common name for several plants in the genus Verbena and may refer to:

Verbena hastata, native to North America
Verbena officinalis, native to Europe